Craig Scott Strachan (born 19 May 1982) is a Scottish retired professional footballer who played as a defensive midfielder for Coventry City and Rochdale in the Football League.

He is the son of Gordon Strachan.

References

1982 births
Living people
Footballers from Aberdeen
Scottish footballers
Association football midfielders
English Football League players
Coventry City F.C. players
Rochdale A.F.C. players
Halesowen Town F.C. players